The Bury Line is a tram line of the Manchester Metrolink running from Manchester city centre to Bury in Greater Manchester. Originally a railway line, it was, along with the Altrincham Line, converted into a tram line during 1991–92, as part of the first phase of the Metrolink system.

The line runs entirely on an old railway alignment without any street running.

History

Pre-Metrolink
The line was originally heavy rail. The first part of what is now the Bury Line was opened by the East Lancashire Railway (ELR) in 1846, From  to  via Salford, Clifton Junction and Radcliffe, continuing north from Bury to Rawtenstall. The ELR was absorbed into the Lancashire and Yorkshire Railway (L&YR) in 1859. 

The second part was opened in 1879. In order to connect the growing suburbs of Cheetham Hill, Prestwich and Whitefield, the L&YR obtained an act to construct a new line from Manchester in 1872 to the original ELR line at Radcliffe. Construction began in 1876 and was completed in 1879. Originally the line had only five intermediate stations at Crumpsall, Heaton Park, Prestwich, Whitefield and Radcliffe. Three more stations were added later: Woodlands Road, Bowker Vale and Besses o' th' Barn.

In response to competition from trams, the line was electrified in 1916 using a unique 1200V DC side-contact third rail system, which remained in operation until the line was converted to Metrolink operation in 1991. From 1959 until 1991, the line was operated by  EMUs. In 1961 they were scheduled to cover the 9¾ miles from Bolton Street to Victoria in 23 minutes and take 24 minutes in the other direction, running at 20 minute intervals for most of the day, but half-hourly on Sundays. With an extra stop, the trams take 23 minutes uphill and 24 minutes downhill.

In August 1953, the Irk Valley Junction rail crash occurred on the line near Manchester Victoria, resulting in ten deaths and 58 injuries. It was caused by an electric train overrunning a danger signal which collided with a steam train, resulting in the front carriage of the electric train crashing into the River Irk. 

The original  station was closed in 1980 and replaced by the new, more conveniently located Bury Interchange. The original Bolton Street station is now part of the East Lancashire Railway heritage railway.

Conversion to Metrolink
The Bury line was identified by transport planners in the 1980s as one of the local railway lines in the Greater Manchester area which was used mostly for local traffic, and could therefore be split off from the main line network and converted to light-rail operation. It was chosen for conversion as part of the first phase of the Metrolink, along with the Manchester Piccadilly to Altrincham Line to the south of Manchester: The two previously unconnected lines were to be linked together by a new street-running line across Manchester city-centre, which included a branch to Manchester Piccadilly railway station. Trams on the Bury Line would thus continue from Victoria station into the city-centre, to either Altrincham or Piccadilly via a new exit into the streets to the south.

Railway operations ended on 17 August 1991, in order for the line to be converted to Metrolink operation. This mostly entailed removing the old third rail system and replacing it with a 750 volt DC overhead line system. Available funding only allowed for minimum upgrades to be made, and so most of the infrastructure such as the stations and track were changed little.

The line became the first Metrolink line to open for business on 6 April 1992, initially between Bury and Victoria.  On 27 April 1992 the city centre section opened, and trams then ran from Bury to Deansgate-Castlefield, the first station on the soon to be opened Altrincham leg of the network. The rest of the line to Altrincham opened on 15 June 1992, and the branch to Piccadilly opened on 20 July 1992.

One of the original stations  was closed in 2013, after two new stations, ( and ) were opened nearby.

Services
As of February 2017, trams between Bury and Manchester run as follows:

Running during Monday to Saturday daytimes and early evenings only.
Running during all operating hours.

These two services combined mean that trams between Bury and Manchester operate every six minutes during Monday to Saturday daytimes, and every 12 minutes during evenings and Sundays.

Rolling stock
All services are operated by M5000 trams. Between 1992 and 2009, the line was operated by the original fleet of 26 T-68 trams. From 2009 the new fleet of M5000 trams was introduced, and these replaced the original T-68 trams. which were withdrawn from service during 2012–14.

Route map

See also
Bury to Holcombe Brook Line

References

External links

 LRTA entry on this line
 Entry on this line from thetrams.co.uk

Manchester Metrolink lines
Rail transport in Greater Manchester
Bury, Greater Manchester
Railway lines opened in 1992
Former railway lines converted to Manchester Metrolink lines